The Battle of Duarte Bridge took place on 27 April 1965, during the Dominican Civil War. The battle resulted in a victory for the Constitutionalist rebels.

Battle
On 27 April 1965, a sizeable Loyalist force of tanks, armored cars, artillery, and infantry began to rumble across Duarte Bridge under covering fire from 12.7 mm machine guns on the eastern bank. When the armored column passed José Martí Street one block from Duarte Avenue, armed civilians attacked the Loyalist infantry and unleashed a hail of fire from machine guns and mortars; most of the troops either fled or were killed. Without infantry support, the unescorted tanks, already in the narrow streets of the neighborhood, were easy targets for the Molotov cocktails soon being tossed from the surrounding buildings. The Loyalists were routed and several tanks were abandoned and put into use by the rebels.

Notes

References
 

Conflicts in 1965
1965 in the Dominican Republic